Alta Vista Ward (Ward 18) is a city ward in the city of Ottawa, Ontario, Canada represented on Ottawa City Council. Alta Vista Ward was created prior to the 1966 election when Gloucester Ward was split in half due to population growth in the Alta Vista area. Until the 1972 elections, the ward was represented by two councillors (then called aldermen). Prior to the 1980 election, the Ward was split in half, with the western half remaining as Alta Vista ward and the eastern half became Canterbury Ward. They were reunited prior to the  1994 Election and was known as Alta Vista-Canterbury Ward. During this time, on regional council it was known as just Alta Vista Ward. It was renamed to Alta Vista in 2000.

The ward is located in Ottawa's southeast end, and covers the neighbourhoods of Eastway Gardens, Riverview, Alta Vista, Heron Gate and Sheffield Glen. The Ward is often advertised by candidates as "Alta Vista-Canterbury-Riverview", as there was a plan to name it that in 1997. The ward covers an area of 20.3 km2. There is only a small boundary change for the 2006 election: the boundary will follow Highway 417 instead of the old city limits from Walkley north to the CPR right-of-way.
 
Until 2014, the ward was represented by Peter Hume. He defeated incumbent Allan Higdon in the 2000 election. It was a battle of incumbents, as Hume was a regional councillor until the Regional Municipality of Ottawa-Carleton was abolished. Jean Cloutier replaced Hume in 2014.

Key issues affecting the Alta Vista ward since 2000 have been: the proposed Alta Vista transportation corridor , the fate of the Canada Science and Technology Museum, as well as the O-Train expansion.

Councillors

School trustees
Ottawa-Carleton District School Board: Chris Ellis (Zone 6, with Rideau-Rockcliffe Ward)
Ottawa Catholic School Board: Mark Mullan (Zone 8, with Gloucester-Southgate Ward)
Conseil des écoles publiques de l'Est de l'Ontario: Marielle Godbout (Zone 9, with Rideau-Rockcliffe Ward)
Conseil des écoles catholiques du Centre-Est: Monique Briand (Zone 10, with Gloucester-Southgate Ward and Osgoode Ward)

Population data
The Ward's population was 46,500 in 2006 (estimate). At the Canada 2001 Census it had 44,435 people.

Languages (mother tongue)
English: 54.6%
French: 15.6%
Arabic: 7.9%
Spanish: 1.8%
Chinese: 1.6% (inc. Mandarin, Cantonese and Chinese)
Italian: 1.1%

Religion
Roman Catholic: 40.0%
Muslim: 11.7%
No religion: 11.4%
Anglican: 8.3%
United Church of Canada: 8.2%
Jewish: 2.0%
Presbyterian: 1.6%
Buddhist: 1.3%
Baptist: 1.3%
Pentecostal: 1.1%

Income
Average household income: $64,697
Average income: $34,941

Election results

1966 elections
 2 elected

1969 elections
2 elected

1972 elections

1974 elections

1976 elections

1978 elections

1980 elections

1982 elections

1985 elections
Dylan McGuinty (brother of future Ontario premier Dalton McGuinty) lost to Tory Darrel Kent.

1988 elections

1991 elections

1994 elections

1997 elections

2000 Ottawa municipal election

2003 Ottawa municipal election

2006 Ottawa municipal election
After running unopposed in 2003, Hume is facing off against Perry Marleau, (a civil servant with the Department of Foreign Affairs and International Trade) Ismael Lediye, notable in the Somali-Canadian community, Yusef Al Mezel (President of the Canadian Auto Workers Union Local 1688), Ahmed Ibrahim, an engineer, and Jim Ryan, a retired Bell Canada and Nortel employee.

2010 Ottawa municipal election

2014 Ottawa municipal election

2018 Ottawa municipal election

2022 Ottawa municipal election

References

External links
 Map of Alta Vista Ward 

Ottawa wards